Sitamarhi Lok Sabha constituency is one of the 40 Lok Sabha (parliamentary) constituencies in Bihar state in eastern India.

Assembly segments
Presently, Sitamarhi Lok Sabha constituency comprises the following six
Vidhan Sabha segments:

Members of Parliament

Election results

See also
 Sitamarhi district
 List of Constituencies of the Lok Sabha

References

Lok Sabha constituencies in Bihar
Politics of Sitamarhi district